A Dorothy L. Sayers Mystery is a series of television adaptations of three Lord Peter Wimsey novels—Strong Poison, Have his Carcase and Gaudy Night—by Dorothy L. Sayers.

The series follows the aristocratic sleuth Lord Peter's romance with the crime writer Harriet Vane, and stars Edward Petherbridge as Wimsey, Harriet Walter as Vane and Richard Morant as Bunter. The adaptations were first broadcast on BBC Two beginning on 25 March 1987.

Production
According to Harriet Walter in her introduction to a reprint of Gaudy Night, the working title of the series was Harriet Vane, since it encompassed all of the novels to feature the character, except for Busman's Honeymoon, for which the BBC could not obtain the rights.

The series was a co-production with the PBS network station WGBH Boston, which broadcast it under the title Lord Peter Wimsey as part of its Mystery! strand. Walter notes that the change of name perhaps reflected a nervousness about hanging a series on a female character, and on a writer whose name was not well known in the United States compared with Sayers' contemporary, Agatha Christie.

Compared to the more flamboyant interpretation by Ian Carmichael in the 1970s BBC adaptations Lord Peter Wimsey, John J. O'Connor notes that Petherbridge "not only looks the part but also manages to convey the darker tones beneath the surface frivolity of the character as well." Petherbridge noted at the time that he saw Wimsey as "maintaining the impenetrable shell of the silly fool, the complete comedian, to camouflage an underlying extraordinary seriousness."

Episodes

References

External links

1987 British television series debuts
1987 British television series endings
BBC television dramas
English-language television shows
1980s British drama television series
Period television series
British crime drama television series
BBC mystery television shows
Television series set in the 1930s
British detective television series